Kgaswane Mountain Reserve is a nature reserve of  consisting of veld and mountains run by the North West Parks and Tourism Board. Kgaswane is home to many species of flora and bird life and large and small mammals, and has been designated as a protected Ramsar site since 2019. The reserve has a number of camp sites, hikes and trails.

History
The reserve was originally established on the farm Rietvallei which once belonged to President Paul Kruger and has expanded over many to cover  with the park proclaimed in 1967.

Fauna and flora
The reserve has over 800 antelope and some other species includes klipspringer, the grey duiker, bushbuck, kudu, oribi, mountain reedbuck, impala, red hartebeest, zebra, springbok, steenbok, sable antelope and  the waterbuck. The reserve also has a few predators like the caracal, aardwolf, jackal and leopard.

320 species of birdlife has recorded in the reserve and includes a breeding colony of Cape vultures as well as martial and black eagles. Other interesting species include Red-winged Francolin, the African black swift and the Sentinel rock thrush.

The reserve consists grassland, scrub, mixed woodland, and pockets of fynbos. 115 tree and bush species are said to grow in the reserve and includes some rare plants.

Recreation
The reserve caters for day visitors who wish to visit the park to picnic or barbeque by following the tarred roads to those sites. For overnight stays, the reserve also has a cottage, a group camp and 22 camping sites. The group camp can accommodate up to fifty people in huts with a communal kitchen and dining area, ablution block and an outdoor boma. The cottage can accommodate fourteen people. The reserve also has a visitors centre.

The reserve has four hiking trails. The Vlei trail is a short  track ideal for viewing birds. The Peglarae Trail is approximately with terrain being steep and rocky.

References

External links
 Kgaswane Nature Reserve pdf

Nature reserves in South Africa
Ramsar sites in South Africa
North West Provincial Parks
Tourist attractions in North West (South African province)
Rustenburg